Neortholomus is a genus of seed bugs in the family Lygaeidae. There are about nine described species in Neortholomus.

Species
These species belong to the genus Neortholomus:
 Neortholomus arphnoides (Baker, 1906)
 Neortholomus gibbifer (Berg, 1892)
 Neortholomus jamaicensis (Dallas, 1852)
 Neortholomus koreshanus (Van Duzee, 1909)
 Neortholomus nevadensis (Baker, 1906)
 Neortholomus procerodorus Hamilton, 1983
 Neortholomus rubricatus (Berg, 1878)
 Neortholomus scolopax (Say, 1831)
 Neortholomus usingeri (Ashlock, 1972)

References

Further reading

External links

 

Lygaeidae